El Tránsito is a municipality in the department of San Miguel, El Salvador. According to the official census of 2016, it has a population of 21,093 inhabitants. It limits the north with the municipality of San Rafael Oriente; to the east with the municipality of San Miguel and the lagoon of El Jocotal; to the southeast with the municipality of Jucuarán; to the southwest with the municipality of Concepción Batres; and to the west with the municipality of Ereguayquín.

Sports
The local professional football club is named C.D. UDET and it currently plays in the Salvadoran Third Division.
Also there were 2 other football teams these are: C.D. San Carlos and C.D. Palucho.

Municipalities of the San Miguel Department (El Salvador)